The Blue Line is a rapid transit line in the MARTA rail system. It operates between Hamilton E. Holmes  and Indian Creek stations, running through Atlanta, Decatur and portions of unincorporated DeKalb County.

The Blue Line was previously called the East-West Line until MARTA switched to a color-based naming system in October 2009.  The East-West Line, from its launch, was considered one line, denoted with a blue color on old system maps until 2006 when the West branch and the Proctor Creek branch were redesignated as the East-West Line (the current Blue Line) and the Proctor Creek Line (the current Green Line).  Using the Five Points station as a reference, the East Line was designated for trips headed to Indian Creek, while the West Line was designated for trips headed to H.E. Holmes.

The rail line was part of the initial launch of MARTA rail service in 1979.  The first segment ran from the East Line segment from Georgia State to the Avondale stations upon the opening in June of that year.  By the end of 1979, it extended west to the Hightower station (now Hamilton E. Holmes) on the West Line segment, which serves as that station's terminus.  Although the North-South line was expanded throughout the 1980s, the East-West line did not see any extension since its opening until 1992 when the Proctor Creek branch of the line opened to its terminus at Bankhead station.  It finally extended to its current eastern terminus at Indian Creek in September 1993.

Now known as the Blue Line, it shares trackage with its counterpart, the Green Line, between just west of Ashby and Edgewood/Candler Park.

Line description
The Blue Line runs above ground, at-grade and below ground in various portions of its route. It begins at the western terminus of H.E. Holmes station, paralleling I-20 and ML King Drive through West Atlanta.  It is joined by the Green Line before Ashby station.  The Blue Line enters downtown Atlanta, where it meets the Red and Gold Lines at Five Points station.  It continues into East Atlanta (where the Green Line terminates at Edgewood/Candler Park station), then enters DeKalb County, including Decatur, before reaching its eastern terminus at Indian Creek station.

Stations
listed from west to east

Note:  The North-South (now Red/Gold Line) platform opened in 1981.

External links

 Blue Line overview
 Blue Line schedule

 
Railway lines opened in 1979
1979 establishments in Georgia (U.S. state)